Exxon Building may refer to:

 Exxon Building (New York)
 ExxonMobil Building, Houston, formerly the Exxon Building and Humble Building
 1555 Poydras, New Orleans, formerly named Exxon Building